East Norton railway station served the village of East Norton, Leicestershire. The station was half a mile east of the village on the north side of the Uppingham to Leicester road, now the A47. on the Great Northern and London and North Western Joint Railway. It opened in 1879 and closed in 1953.

The station has been demolished and the area landscaped erasing all trace of the railway.

References

Disused railway stations in Leicestershire
Railway stations in Great Britain opened in 1879
Railway stations in Great Britain closed in 1953
Former Great Northern Railway stations
Former London and North Western Railway stations